Geneseo Township is one of sixteen townships in Cerro Gordo County, Iowa, United States.  As of the 2000 census, its population was 1,206.

Geography
According to the USGS, it contains two cemeteries: Linn Grove and Sacred Heart. The city of Sheffield borders it to the south.

References

External links
 US-Counties.com
 City-Data.com

Townships in Cerro Gordo County, Iowa
Mason City, Iowa micropolitan area
Townships in Iowa